Jason John Gesser (born May 31, 1979) is an American college football former coach, former player, and former assistant athletic director at Washington State University.

He was previously the interim head coach, offensive coordinator, quarterbacks coach, and recruiting coordinator for the Idaho Vandals of the WAC. He played quarterback for Washington State Cougars of the Pac-10 under head coach Mike Price, and played in the 2003 Rose Bowl. As a professional, Gesser played for the Utah Blaze of the Arena Football League (AFL), the Calgary Stampeders of the Canadian Football League (CFL), and the Tennessee Titans of the National Football League (NFL). He was originally hired at Idaho as running backs coach in June 2011. Gesser is the grandson of Green Bay Packers Hall of Fame member Joseph "Red" Dunn.

High school years
Gesser attended Saint Louis School in Honolulu and played football for Cal Lee. In his junior year he was named to the all-state team and led the Crusaders to a state championship. In his senior year, St. Louis ranked as high as fourth in the national prep poll and won a second straight state title. He was All-West pick by Prep Star and an academic All-American choice by Prep Star. The Crusaders were 24-0 in games Gesser started.

College career
Gesser played college football at Washington State University in Pullman. He is the only player in Cougar history to be elected as captain three consecutive years. Gesser led WSU to two straight 10 win seasons from 2001-2002, and finished seventh in the 2002 Heisman Trophy race. Gesser and USC quarterback Carson Palmer were named Pac-10 Co-Offensive Players of the Year in 2002. The Honolulu native earned First-team All-America honors and finished his Cougar career as a three time All-Pac-10 selection, and a four-time Academic All-Pac-10 honoree. Gesser left WSU owning school records in a number of offensive categories, some which included career starts (34), total yards (9,007), pass attempts (1,118), completions (611), touchdown passes (70), and consecutive games with a touchdown pass (25). During his career, he appeared in 40 games, made 35 starts, led the Pac-10 in passing yards as junior, was the first Cougar to throw for 3,000 yards twice and led WSU to a 2001 Sun Bowl victory and to the 2003 Rose Bowl. He is second, only to Luke Falk, in having the most wins of any quarterback in Washington State history. He was inducted into the Washington State University Athletics Hall of Fame in 2016, and was also ranked 9th of the top 12 greatest Washington State University football players of All-Time by the Pac-12 Networks.

Professional career

National Football League (NFL)
Gesser was signed by the Tennessee Titans as an undrafted free agent in April 2003. He spent the entire season with the team but did not see any playing time behind Steve McNair, Billy Volek, and Neil O'Donnell. He was released after the 2004 preseason.

Canadian Football League (CFL)
On May 5, 2005, Gesser was signed by the Calgary Stampeders. He started the season as Henry Burris' backup, but took over the starting role when Burris tore a ligament in his left thumb. He only started two games, both victories, before spraining his ankle.   He finished the season completing 23 of 42 passes for 356 yards, four touchdowns and five interceptions.

Arena Football League (AFL)
In 2006 Gesser signed with the AFL's Utah Blaze. He was the backup at the beginning of the season before replacing the injured Joe Germaine. He completed 89 of 145 passes for 1,092 yards, 23 touchdowns, and seven interceptions. After going winless in four starts, he was replaced by Andy Kelly. Gesser saw little playing time behind a healthy Germaine in 2007, completing two of three passes for 28 yards and a touchdown.

Coaching
Gesser said his ultimate goal is coaching at the college level, preferably at Washington State. During the 2006 off-season he was a quarterbacks coach at Federal Way High School in Federal Way, Washington. In 2007, he was offensive coordinator at Parkland's Franklin Pierce High School. He and fellow ex-Cougar Ryan Leaf both campaigned for the position of quarterbacks coach at WSU when it became available after the 2007 season. That job eventually went to Offensive Coordinator Todd Sturdy.

Eastside Catholic
In the spring of 2009, Gesser was named as the head football coach at Eastside Catholic School in Sammamish, Washington. He succeeded Bill Marsh, who had resigned after ten seasons with the school. Gesser coached the Crusaders for two seasons, then left in 2011 to become a graduate assistant at WSU in Pullman.

Idaho
Gesser returned to the Palouse in May 2011, then crossed the state border in June and joined the staff at Idaho as running backs coach in neighboring Moscow. He filled the open position left by his successor at Eastside Catholic, Jeremy Thielbar, a former Cougar teammate. Idaho's head coach Robb Akey was the defensive line coach at WSU during Gesser's playing days for the Cougars. In February 2012, Gesser was promoted to offensive coordinator of the Vandals, assisted on offense by another former WSU coach, Mike Levenseller, who was the receivers coach and passing game coordinator. Gesser recruited the Pacific Northwest and Hawaii for Idaho. After only one victory in the first eight games, Akey was fired on October 21 and Gesser was promoted to interim head coach. The Vandals lost their final four games to finish 1–11 for the 2012 season. Paul Petrino was hired as head coach on December 3 and did not retain Gesser on the coaching staff for 2013.

Wyoming
Gesser was hired as the quarterbacks coach at Wyoming in February 2013, under fourth-year head coach Dave Christensen.

Personal life
Following allegations from multiple women of sexual misconduct, Gesser resigned from WSU in September 2018.  In December 2018, WSU found that Gesser violated the school's policy against sexual harassment.  Gesser did not participate in the investigation, but was also never found guilty of any crime.

Head coaching record

College

See also
 List of National Football League and Arena Football League players

References

1979 births
Living people
American football quarterbacks
American players of Canadian football
Canadian football quarterbacks
Calgary Stampeders players
Idaho Vandals football coaches
Utah Blaze players
Tennessee Titans players
Washington State Cougars football players
Wyoming Cowboys football coaches
High school football coaches in Washington (state)
Sportspeople from Honolulu
Coaches of American football from Hawaii
Players of American football from Honolulu
Players of Canadian football from Honolulu